Baccara is the debut studio album by Spanish duo Baccara, first released on RCA Victor in Germany in 1977. It contains the European hit singles "Yes Sir, I Can Boogie" and "Sorry, I'm a Lady".

The rights to the RCA-Victor back catalogue are currently held by Sony BMG Music Entertainment - the original Baccara album in its entirety remains unreleased on compact disc.

There is an alternative cover for the album from Scandinavia featuring the girls standing with a black background. Some editions of this album feature a limited edition poster. The album was re-released in Germany in 1982 and featured an entirely different picture sleeve.

Track listing

Alternative album editions 

 Additional track Japan and The Netherlands: A6 "Mad In Madrid" (Soja, Dostal) - 3:24.

Personnel 
 Mayte Mateos - vocals
 María Mendiola - vocals

Production 
 Tracks 1, 4, 5, 6 published by Magazine Music.
 Tracks 2 & 7 published by Cyclus Music.
 Track 3 published by Peermusic.
 Tracks 8-11 published by Intersong.
 Arranged & Produced by Rolf Soja.
 Recorded by Günther Dyke & Günther Zipelius.
 Recorded at Polydor Studio & Studio Maschen.

Charts

Certifications and sales

References

Baccara albums
1977 debut albums
RCA Records albums